The Salters School of Chemistry is a branch of Christ's Hospital that teaches mainly chemistry to all Christ's Hospital pupils.  It was founded by Samuel Porter and the Worshipful Company of Salters (one of the livery company that sponsors children to study at CH) in 1993.  It is currently Christ's Hospital's Chemistry Department.

See also
Royal Mathematical School

Chemistry education
Christ's Hospital
Educational institutions established in 1993
1993 establishments in England